The Extradition (Amendment) Act, 1994 (An Act To Amend and Extend the Extradition Acts, 1965 to 1987) was an act passed by the Oireachtas, the national legislature of the Republic of Ireland. The Act restricted the use of the defence of 'political offence' by defendants against extradition.

External links
 Debate on the Second reading of the Bill
 Irish Statute Book 1922-2003
 Acts of the Oireachtas 1997 ---

1994 in Irish law
Acts of the Oireachtas of the 1990s
The Troubles (Northern Ireland)
Extradition